Tickle Me Elmo is a children's plush toy from Tyco Preschool, a division of Tyco Toys, of the Muppet character Elmo from the children's television show Sesame Street. When squeezed, Elmo shakes, vibrates, and recites his trademark giggle.

The toy was first produced in the United States in 1996 and slowly became a fad, reaching its apex during the 1996 Christmas shopping season, with some instances of violence reported over the limited available supply. People reported that the toy, which retailed for $28.99 according to its MSRP, was being re-sold by scalpers in newspapers and on the Internet for up to $1,500 by the end of 1996.

Development 

"Tickles The Chimp", the precursor to Tickle Me Elmo, was invented by Greg Hyman and Ron Dubren, who were known in the toy industry for having invented Alphie the Robot (a children's learning computer) several years prior. In 1995 it was presented to Tyco Preschool as "Tickles The Chimp," which was a toy monkey with a computer chip which laughed when tickled. At the time Tyco didn't have rights to make the Sesame Street plush, but did have the Looney Tunes plush rights so it was worked on for several months as Tickle Me Tasmanian Devil, they also made Tickle Me versions of baby Bugs Bunny and Tweety, they successfully sold it at WB Studio Store in California. A short time later, Tyco lost rights to do Looney Tunes but gained the rights to Sesame Street, thus starting Tickle Me Elmo.  The invention was originally introduced under Cabbage Patch at Hasbro Industries.

Neil Friedman, who was then president of Tyco Preschool, recalled years later that, "When you played with Tickle Me Elmo for the first time, it brought a smile to everyone's face. It was a magical surprise."

1996 Elmo craze
Tickle Me Elmo was released in July 1996, with a supply of 400,000 units. The dolls sold well and remained widely available in stores until the day after Thanksgiving, when they suddenly sold out. With the Christmas shopping season approaching, Tyco Preschool ordered 600,000 more dolls from their suppliers. Promotion was helped by Rosie O'Donnell, who had shown the toy on her popular TV show in early October. O'Donnell's "surprise plug" was probably too early to create unexpected demand for Elmo, as the resulting shortages in the stores that sold it happened nearly two months later.

The scarcity of the new toy provoked a "shopping frenzy". Two women were arrested in Chicago for fighting over the doll, while in New York City some people ran after delivery trucks hoping to get their hands on Elmo before it reached stores. Someone allegedly purchased a Tickle Me Elmo for $7,100 in Denver. KBIG in Los Angeles had a radio auction for charity December 20, 1996; Bob's Pharmacy won and purchased a Tickle-Me-Elmo For $18,500. A clerk working at a Wal-Mart store in Fredericton, New Brunswick, Canada was among those injured by "Elmo-mania". During a Midnight Madness sale on December 14, a crowd of 300 stampeded down the aisle after spotting him being handed a box of the toys by another employee. Trampled, he suffered "a pulled hamstring, injuries to his back, jaw and knee, a broken rib and a concussion".

By the end of December, the entire stock of one million "Tickle Me Elmo" toys had been sold.

Further Tickle Me toys
In early 1997, Tyco released new "Tickle Me" toys based on other characters from Sesame Street – first Tickle Me Ernie and Tickle Me Big Bird, then Tickle Me Cookie Monster – but despite good sales, none of these toys achieved as much fame as Tickle Me Elmo. With the re-release of Tickle Me Elmo, Mini Tickle Me Cookie Monster and Mini Tickle Me Ernie were also put on the market.

The "Surprise Edition" of Tickle Me Elmo, issued fall 2001, was an elaborate contest. Five of the "Surprise Edition" Elmos stopped laughing on January 9, 2002, and instead announced to the people squeezing them that they had won a prize. The grand prize was US$200,000.

TMX (2006 & 2007)
For the tenth anniversary of Tickle Me Elmo, Fisher-Price released a new Elmo doll in 2006 called TMX, meaning "Tickle Me (Elmo) Ten".  The toy, which was designed by Bruce Lund of Lund and Co. Invention (River Forest, Illinois), was first announced at the American International Toy Fair. Rather than simply vibrating like the original, the TMX rolls around on the floor, laughing and smashing his fist on the ground, begging for the tickler to stop.

The full look of the doll was not revealed until it debuted live on ABC's Good Morning America and arrived on store shelves on September 19, 2006. Toy experts said that the delay was unprecedented, with only a few people in the media allowed to preview the product, and only after signing confidentiality agreements. The packaging was designed so that the doll could not be seen without purchasing it. The box includes a preview flap, but upon opening, only the doll's eyes are visible. It requires six AA batteries and costs approximately $40. In a promotional clip, Jim Silver, co-publisher of Toy Wishes magazine said, "The first reaction I had was, 'Where are the wires?' Because I didn't think anything like that could move on its own.".

Toy analyst Chris Byrne told USA Today, "This is a quantum leap forward, another breakthrough in the preschool plush category." Byrne believed sales would be high, but the reaction would not be as unprecedented. "The culture has moved beyond that, the whole hot-toy phenomenon." He cited the fact there has not been such a craze since Furby in 1998. However, some members of the media expected a large response. Toys "R" Us stores and Amazon had a pre-sale program for the doll, the first included elaborate in-store displays with a digital countdown to the doll's launch. Amazon took more presale orders than it could fulfill. As with the original Tickle Me Elmo doll, demand for the new toy gave rise to some extreme acts. One person in Tampa, Florida was allegedly threatened with a gun to hand over a TMX toy. This was parodied on Saturday Night Live, which said the man "was subdued by the new 'Gimmie a Reason Bert'".

TMX and other toys helped Mattel's earnings for the third quarter of the 2006 financial year to grow by six percent and beat the expectations of financial analysts. TMX also helped increase sales of other Elmo toys.

In January 2007, Mattel announced it would release TMX Friends, featuring Elmo, Ernie and Cookie Monster.

LOL Elmo (2012)
Playskool released the toy again as LOL Elmo. Not a single image of the toy was revealed until the American International Toy Fair 2012; in the Hasbro showroom's Sesame Street section, there is a sign printed "Laughter Unleashed! Fall 2012".  Above it was a video of kids giggling. The toy was released in September. It is also known as Tickle Time Elmo.

Tickle Me Elmo (2017)
Playskool made a new version of this toy once again but they made it part of their Playskool Friends lineup. Its behavior is like the 1996 version but has more phrases like "Elmo is one ticklish monster". This toy released in August 2017. It could be found at Walmart, Books A Million, Best Buy, Target, and Toys R Us, among others.

Legacy 
Tickle Me Elmo helped Children's Television Workshop recover from its financial problems that it had been dealing with since the 1980s, and also helped in boosting the popularity of Sesame Street, which had been facing stiff competition from other children's shows throughout the 1990s. Likely as a response to this craze, the show began pushing Elmo to a starring role more heavily, a practice that is still done on the show today. This most noticeably resulted in the show dedicating the last few minutes of every episode to the character, beginning in 1998 with Elmo's World, with three other Elmo-centric segments debuting on the show since then.

Non Tickle-Me Elmo Toys
 1998: "Walk 'n' Talk" (with Big Bird and Cookie Monster)
 1999: "Rock 'n' Roll" (with Ernie)
 2000: "Let's Pretend Elmo"
 2002: "Chicken Dance Elmo"
 2003: "Hokey Pokey Elmo"
 2004: "E.L.M.O"
 2005: "Shout Elmo"
 2008: "Elmo Live!"
 2009: 
"Elmo Live!: ENCORE"
"Elmo's Tickle Hands"
 2011: "Let's Rock Elmo"
 2013: "Big Hugs Elmo"
 2014: "Let's Imagine Elmo"
 2015: "Play All Day Elmo"
 2016: "Love2Learn Elmo"
 2018: "Let's Dance Elmo"
 2019: "Love to Hug Elmo"
 2020: "Rock 'n' Rhyme Elmo"

See also
 Furby
 ZhuZhu Pets
 Hatchimal
 FurReal Friends
 List of toys

References

External links

 Wired: Elmo's Worth More Than a Tickle on the Surprise Edition

 CBS13.com: Elmo Demonstration , video demonstration of the new Tickle Me Elmo

Sesame Street
Products introduced in 1996
1990s toys
1990s fads and trends
Fisher-Price
Stuffed toys
Tickling
Toy controversies